The high-voltage (400 kV and 275 kV) electricity substations in the United Kingdom are listed in the following tables. The substations provide entry points to, and exit points from, the National Grid (GB) or Northern Ireland Electricity Network. Entry points include power stations, major wind farms and inter-connectors from other countries and regions. Exit points are to lower voltage (275 kV, 132 kV, 66 kV and 33 kV) transmission and distribution substations which are also shown in the tables.

History 
The first high-voltage substations in Britain were built as part of the National Grid in 1927–33 by the Central Electricity Board under the provisions of the Electricity (Supply) Act 1926. The substations and the grid operated at 132 kV and provided local and regional inter-connections. Higher voltage substations were built as part of the super-grid designed for the bulk transfer of electricity which began to operate from 1953, firstly at 275 kV then from 1965 additionally at 400 kV. The first 400 kV line was the 150 mile section between West Burton power station in Nottinghamshire and Sundon substation in Bedfordshire, the line had a capacity of 1,800 MVA per circuit. The first 400 kV substations in Scotland were commissioned in 1972 associated with the line from Hunterston, Ayrshire to Neilston, Renfrewshire. 

From 1958 the super-grid and its substations were built by the Transmission Project Group within the Central Electricity Generating Board and included architects and landscape architects. The 400 kV super-grid reduced the number of lines and substations and therefore the number of amenity objections. Some substations in urban areas were installed in enclosed structures but the majority were in the open. The appearance of substations, and their visual impact, was improved using earth mounds and trees. Between 1968 and 1973, 725,000 tall trees, 915,400 smaller trees and 17,600 ground cover plants had been used to screen substations. The substation at Sundon, Bedfordshire adjacent to the M1 motorway was screened with a beech hedge, and at Bishop’s Wood in Worcestershire the substation was built within an existing wood. In 1972 a Mark II low profile 400 kV substation was commissioned, the first was at Wymondley, Hertfordshire. The substation used lighter support structures and the height was reduced from 72 ft to 53 ft (21.9 m to 16.1 m).

The rapid development of the 400 kV system is demonstrated in the numbers of new substations that were being built: in 1971 ten 400 kV substations were commissioned by the CEGB, these were: Pheasant Farm, Abham, Didcot, Exeter, Hinkley Point, Indian Queens, Landulph, Melksham, Drax and Harker. By 1973 there were sixty-one 400 kV substations. In 1979 there were a total of 201 (275 kV and 400 kV) substations.  By the time of privatisation of the British electricity industry in 1990 there were 212 substations operating at 275 kV and 400 kV, and a total of 4,069 circuit km operating at 275 kV, and 9,822 circuit km at 400 kV. In 2020 there were 179 400 kV substations and 137 275 kV substations.

Centralised co-ordination of electricity supplies in Northern Ireland began with the establishment of the Electricity Board for Northern Ireland in 1931. The Northern Ireland Electricity Service was established on 1 April 1973 by the Electricity Supply (Northern Ireland) Order 1972. The integrated electricity network was built in the late 1960s and early 1970s. In 1979 the system comprised 323 route km of 275 kV lines, 836 route km of 110 kV line, and 38,875 km of distribution mains.

Owners and operators 
The 275/400 kV grid and substations in England and Wales are owned and operated by National Grid Electricity Transmission plc. It also operates the grid and substations in Scotland although the systems are owned by Scottish Power and Scottish & Southern Energy. In Northern Ireland grid and substations are owned and operated by Northern Ireland Electricity Networks Limited (NIE Networks).

England and Wales

400 kV substations 
The 400 kV substations in England and Wales and their interconnections are given in the following table. The identification codes (e.g. 4YF) for the interconnecting lines and the lower voltage transmission, if any, from the substation are also given.

275 kV substations 
The 275 kV substations in England and Wales and their interconnections are given in the following table. The lower voltage transmission, if any, from the substation is also given.

Scotland

400 kV substations 
The 400 kV substations in Scotland and their interconnections are given in the following table. The identification codes for the interconnecting lines and the lower voltage transmission, if any, from the substation are also given.

There are two interconnections between England and Scotland. On the west coast the 400 kV overland line between Harker substation in Cumbria and Gretna substation, Dumfries and Galloway. On the east coast the 400 kV line between Stella West substation, Tyne and Wear and Eccles substation, Borders. 

In addition the 600 kV DC Western HVDC underground and sub-marine link connects Flintshire Bridge Converter station, in Flintshire Wales, to the Western HVDC Converter station near Hunterston.

275 kV substations 
The 275 kV substations in Scotland and their interconnections are given in the following table. The identification codes for the interconnecting lines and the lower voltage transmission, if any, from the substation are also given.

The Moyle Interconnector provides a high-voltage link between the Scotland and Northern Ireland 275 kV systems.

Northern Ireland

275 kV substations 
There are no 400 kV systems in Northern Ireland; the highest transmission voltage is 275 kV. The substations and their interconnections are given in the table. The lower voltage (generally 110 kV) transmission from the substation is also given.

See also 
 National Grid (Great Britain)
 Northern Ireland Electricity
 List of power stations in England
 List of power stations in Scotland
 List of power stations in Wales
 List of power stations in Northern Ireland
 List of EHV-substations in Austria
 List of EHV-substations in Switzerland

References 

Electric power infrastructure in the United Kingdom
Electric power transmission in the United Kingdom
National Grid (Great Britain)